The Glenrothes distillery is a Speyside single malt Scotch whisky distillery. The Glenrothes distillery is located in the town of Rothes in the heart of the Speyside region of Scotland. The distillery sits beside the Burn of Rothes, hidden in a glen on the edge of the town. 

The Glenrothes is renowned for the quality, structure and flavour, the result of over 140 years of whisky making tradition. Since its opening, the whisky from the distillery has been one of the most sought after on Speyside. In 2018, The Glenrothes 25 Year Old was awarded the Ultimate Spirits Challenge top honour, the Chairman's Trophy for Best Speyside Single Malt.

Production

Under the ownership of Berry Bros. & Rudd, vintage bottlings of The Glenrothes were produced from 1993 onwards. The Vintage 2004 is considered the last known vintage to be bottled by the distillery. In 2018, The Glenrothes replaced its vintage range with a series of age statement single malts that included a 10, 12, 18 and 25 Year Old.

The Glenrothes is mainly matured in Sherry-seasoned European and American oak casks, built to specification in Jerez, Spain. Ex-Bourbon cask are also used but to a much lesser extent. The result is a multidimensional single malt range with a spectrum of flavours ranging from the delicate and fresh 10 Year Old to the rich and sophisticated 25 Year Old. 

Special bottlings include "Single Cask" bottles, which are taken from one single cask of whisky from a particular year. 

The Glenrothes is one of the rare Scotch whisky distilleries to have a cooperage on site.

Character
The house style of the Glenrothes is rich, fully rounded and elegant. The whisky delivers a ripe bouquet of fruits and creamy vanilla, sometimes more spicy, sometimes more floral.

History
The distillery was built in 1878 by James Stuart & Co, who then also worked the nearby Macallan distillery. The first whisky ran off the stills on the 28 December 1879, the same day as the Tay Bridge disaster.

The distillery itself had a shaky start and turbulent history. Over-proof whisky is notoriously highly flammable and the distillery has paid the price. Extension work began in 1896 on a second malt kiln, and an increase in stills from two to four but, before the work was finished, a fire in December 1897 caused serious damage. The distillery saw further damage with a serious explosion in 1903.

Another fire in 1962 afforded the opportunity for expansion and a further re-build in 1982 extended the still hall to five wash stills and five spirit stills.

See also
King's Ginger

References

External links
 The Glenrothes website

Distilleries in Scotland
Scottish malt whisky
Food and drink companies established in 1878
1878 establishments in Scotland
British companies established in 1878
Rothes